The Italian Nettist Party (PNI), better known as the Steak Party, was a joke political party founded in Italy in 1953 by publisher Corrado Tedeschi. Considered a forerunner of anti-politics or the first Italian satirical party, the Steak Party took part in the 1953 Italian general election, promising to give people a steak every day.

History

In 1950s Florence, publisher Corrado Tedeschi, together with Ugo Cavallini, founded a political party named after their popular weekly puzzle magazine  (NET). The party was nicknamed the Steak Party with its symbol being a heifer because the political program, among other things, would deliver a daily supply of steak to every citizen. The party also had an official anthem made up of cows' moos.

The party had a more than evident mocking, goliardic, surrealist intent, and just as evidently parodied the populist Common Man's Front.

Despite being a joke political party, the Italian Nettist Party took part in the 7 June 1953 general elections for the Chamber of Deputies, contesting the constituencies of Rome, Florence, and Milan. Their mottos were "Long Live Fun!", and "Better a steak today than an empire tomorrow".

The Steak Party collected 4,305 valid votes, equivalent to 0.02% at the national level (or 0.14% in just Florence).

Political program

Corrado Tedeschi presented the Nettist Party official program for 1953 Italian general election as follows:
 Leisure activities, little work, and a lot of money for everyone. Machines must replace man in the suffering of work. The characteristic of the human species is intelligence and it is by exploiting it that it must survive.
 Free medical care and medicine for all.
 Three months of vacation for every citizen.
  of steak per person insured daily to the people, dessert, fruit and coffee.
 Maximum increase in all games: arts, literature, music, and dance. Life is so short and we know so little about its consistency and purpose that the most serious thing about life is the game.
 Continuous raffles and lotteries will entertain the citizens of the universal state.
 State Companions of variety and clowns will be supremely honored and rewarded in the Universal Republic. It is time to end the sacrifices and missions! Let us laugh and be in good health.
 Abolition of all taxes.
 Referendums extended to all citizens will decide each time the most important local and universal issues instead of the outdated Parliaments. Statistical machines, electronic brains, will make the gears of the scientific universal republic turn. The current employees of the State will be sent in retirement and vacation with double salary.
 School lessons will be reduced to 30 hours per year. Enigmatic NET, radio, television, cinema, and various shows will educate the sovereign and Nettist people.
 Existing religions will be held in the highest honour and new churches with artistic and mystical intentions will be erected. Priests of all religions will receive fair salaries that will remove them from poverty.
 Abolition of prisons. When all have  of insured meat, nobody will need to steal and kill. If there are any exceptions, we will treat them in asylums. We must lift humanity out of fear of war and imprisonment.

See also

1953 Italian general election
List of frivolous political parties
Bistecca alla fiorentina

References

Defunct political parties in Italy
Joke political parties in Italy
Political parties established in 1953
1953 establishments in Italy
Steak